Shanthi Krishna is an Indian actress known for her leading roles in Malayalam and Tamil films. As a star in the 1980s and 1990s, she won the Kerala State Film Award for Best Actress for her performance as Sharadammini in Chakoram (1994), the Filmfare Award for Best Supporting Actress – Malayalam for her performance in Njandukalude Nattil Oridavela, and the Kerala state television award for best actress three times in a row.

Early life

Her parents are R. Krishna and K. Sharada, a Palakkad family based in Bombay. She completed her education at Mumbai S.I.E.S. College and General Education Academy. Her three brothers are Sreeram, Satheesh and film director Suresh Krissna.
 
The same year, she acted in her first Tamil film, Paneer Pushpangal. She quit the film industry after her first marriage, but made a comeback in 1991 in the movie Nayam Vyakthamakkunnu. She won the Kerala State Film Award for Best Actress for her performance in Chakoram (1994). In 1997 she stopped appearing in Malayalam movies. She served as a jury member in Malayalam film awards. She made a second comeback in 2017 with the movie Njandukalude Nattil Oridavela.

Personal life
Shanthi Krishna married Malayalam actor Sreenath in 1984 and divorced him in 1995. She married Sadasivan Bajore in 1998, the secretary of Rajiv Gandhi Group of Institutions. They have two children, Mithul and Mithali. The couple divorced in 2016. She lived in the US for a while and later returned to Bangalore.

Awards

Kerala State Film Awards
 1992 - Second Best Actress - Savidham
 1994 - Best Actress - Chakoram
 Other Awards
2017 - Asiavision Awards for Best supporting actress - Njandukalude Nattil Oridavela
2018 - Vanitha Film Awards for Best supporting actress  - Njandukalude Nattil Oridavela
2018 - Flowers Indian film Awards 2018 - Best Supporting actress  - Njandukalude Nattil Oridavela
2018 - Asianet Film Awards - Best Character Actress  - Njandukalude Nattil Oridavela
2018 - Filmfare Award for Best Supporting Actress – Malayalam -Njandukalude Nattil Oridavela
2018 - Jaycee foundation Awards 2018 - Best Supporting actress  - Njandukalude Nattil Oridavela
2018 - NAFA awards USA - Best supporting actress- Njandugalude Nattil Oridavela

Filmography
All films are in Malayalam, unless otherwise noted.

Television
Chitrageetham (Doordarshan) as Host
Chapalyam (Doordarshan)
Ammayi (Telefilm, Doordarshan)
Scooter (Doordarshan) as Swayamprabha
Seemantham (Doordarshan) as Swayamprabha
Kuthirakal (Doordarshan)
Paliyathachan (Doordarshan)
Mohapakshikal (Doordarshan)
Malayali Veettamma (FLOWERS TV) as Judge
Comedy stars season 2 (Asianet) as Judge
Kaliveedu (Surya TV)
MY G Flowers Oru Kodi (FLOWERS TV) as Participant
Oru Chiri Iruchiri Bumper Chiri (Mazhavil Manorama)  as Judge

References

External links
 

Living people
20th-century Indian actresses
Actresses in Malayalam cinema
Indian film actresses
Actresses in Tamil cinema
Kerala State Film Award winners
Actresses from Mumbai
21st-century Indian actresses
Actresses in Kannada cinema
Indian television actresses
Actresses in Hindi television
Actresses in Malayalam television
Actresses in Telugu cinema
Year of birth missing (living people)
Place of birth missing (living people)